Guelph (formerly Guelph—Wellington) is a federal electoral district in Ontario, Canada, that has been represented in the House of Commons of Canada since 1979. This riding has had a Liberal MP since 1993.

From 2008 until his decision not to run in 2015, the riding's parliamentary seat was held by Liberal MP Frank Valeriote. Valeriote had announced his intention to retire on November 15, 2014.
The Liberal candidate in the 2015 federal election in the riding was Lloyd Longfield, who previously served as president of the Guelph Chamber of Commerce. Longfield was first elected on October 19, 2015 and reelected on October 21, 2019.

History

Guelph riding was created in 1976 from parts of Halton—Wentworth, Wellington and Wellington—Grey ridings. It consisted initially of the Townships of Eramosa, Guelph, Pilkington and Puslinch and the City of Guelph in the County of Wellington.

The electoral district was abolished in 1987 when it was merged into Guelph—Wellington riding, adding Erin to the existing boundaries.  In 1996, Erin and Pilkington was removed from the riding.

In 2003, a new riding of Guelph was created again, consisting solely of the City of Guelph.

This riding gained a fraction of territory from Wellington—Halton Hills during the 2012 electoral redistribution.

A so-called "robocall" or voter suppression scandal occurred in this riding during the 2011 federal election, when hundreds of Guelph voters who were opposition supporters received automated calls, or 'robocalls', claiming to be from Elections Canada on election day, May 2, 2011. These calls directed them to the wrong polling stations. While reports of such calls were also alleged in five other ridings, later described as election fraud by a Federal Court judge, there was insufficient evidence to support charges in those ridings. The "robocall" incidents were referred to as the "Pierre Poutine" scandal because a cellphone in the affair was registered to a fictitious Pierre Poutine of Separatist Street in Joliette, Quebec.

On June 2, 2014, Michael Sona, the former director of communications for the Conservative candidate in Guelph was charged with "wilfully preventing or endeavouring to prevent an elector from voting". Sona was found guilty on November 14, 2014 and was sentenced to nine months in jail plus twelve months of probation. During the trial, Justice Hearn agreed with the Crown prosecutor's allegation that Sona had likely not acted alone.
Sona was released from the Maplehurst Correctional Complex on December 1, 2014, on bail after serving twelve days, pending his appeal of the sentence. He did not appeal the conviction.

Based on another incident during the 2011 federal election campaign, Liberal MP Frank Valeriote’s riding association was fined by the Canadian Radio-television and Telecommunications Commission for violations of the Unsolicited Telecommunications Rules. As reported by the National Post, this fine was based on a robocall message that anonymously attacked the Conservative opponent's position on abortion. The call failed to identify its originator and did not give a callback number. Under a settlement agreement with Valeriote, the CRTC assessed a  fine.

Political geography
In 2008, the election in Guelph was a four-way one between the NDP, Greens, the Tories and the Liberals, who came out on top. The NDP only won a small handful of polls in the centre part of the city, which was also where the Greens did well. In fact, the Greens dominated the central part of the city. The Tories did well on the fringes of the city, mostly along the northern borders and in the far south of the city. The Liberals won the southern and northern and western parts of the city.
In 2011, despite a Conservative majority that saw the Liberals have their worst result ever, they were able to retain the seat by a larger margin as the substantial Green voteshare fell by almost 15 points.
In 2015, Liberal voteshare once again rose, to almost 50%. In 2019, the Greens made a major comeback to finish in second ahead o the Conservatives with 26%. However, the Liberals retained the seat with a comfortable 15 point margin.

Demographics
According to the Canada 2001 Census

 Ethnic groups: 87.7% White, 2.7% Chinese, 2.6% South Asian, 1.3% Southeast Asian, 1.3% Black, 1.1% Filipino
 Languages: 80.1% English, 1.5% French, 17.4% Others
 Religions: 37.7% Protestant, 31.5% Catholic, 3.1% Other Christian, 1.6% Buddhist, 1.6% Muslim, 1.2% Christian Orthodox, 20.8% No religion
 Average income: $32,405

Members of Parliament

This riding has elected the following member of the Canadian House of Commons:

Election results

2021 general election

2019 general election

2015 Federal election

2011 general election

2008 general election
The call for a federal election to be held on October 14, 2008 occurred when Guelph was already in the throes of a by-election scheduled for September 8, which was intended to replace retiring Liberal MP Brenda Chamberlain. As a result of this, the by-election was cancelled, and the four major candidates running opted to represent their parties again in the federal election. They included: Frank Valeriote, a local lawyer with thorough community experience who had garnered the Liberal nomination in an upset over Marva Wisdom; Gloria Kovach, a popular city councillor and former President of the Federation of Canadian Municipalities who was controversially handed the Conservative nomination after incumbent nominee Brent Barr was ousted; Tom King, a renowned author and Native rights activist who received several high-profile endorsements after his NDP nomination; and Mike Nagy, a long-time Green Party spokesperson.

Initially in Guelph, optimism ran high that either the NDP, Green Party, or Conservative Party could procure the seat, as many felt that the nominees might benefit from the relative unpopularity of Stéphane Dion's Liberals and the gaffes made by prior Liberal MP Brenda Chamberlain, who had failed to show up to a number of Parliamentary votes and retired before the end of her term in office. Ultimately, however, Frank Valeriote was able to narrowly garner the seat over star candidate Gloria Kovach, who lost by around three percent and decreased the margin of defeat for her party. Noteworthy, too, was the increase in the electoral returns of the Green Party, who managed to fare better than the federal NDP in Guelph for the first time, finishing with twenty-one percent of the vote – almost three times what they had received in the 2006 election. In terms of distance from winning position, Guelph was the Green Party's best result in the country in 2008.

2006 general election

2004 general election

Note: Conservative vote is compared to the total of the Canadian Alliance vote and Progressive Conservative vote in 2000 election.

1988–2003
The riding was part of the riding known as Guelph—Wellington from 1988 to 2003. It was created in 1987 to include parts of Wellington—Dufferin—Simcoe electoral districts.

Guelph—Wellington initially consisted of the City of Guelph, the Village of Erin, and the townships of Eramosa, Erin, Guelph, Pilkington and Puslinch in the County of Wellington.

In 1996, the riding was re-defined to consist of the City of Guelph and the townships of Eramosa, Guelph and Puslinch before being abolished in 2003, and split into the current electoral district and Wellington—Halton Hills electoral district.

Note: Canadian Alliance vote is compared to the Reform vote in 1997 election.

1979–1984

See also
 List of Canadian federal electoral districts
 Past Canadian electoral districts

References

Notes

External links
1976-87  Riding history from the Library of Parliament
2003-2008 Riding history from the Library of Parliament
2011 Results from Elections Canada
 Campaign expense data from Elections Canada

Ontario federal electoral districts
Politics of Guelph